Gentle on My Mind is a compilation album of singles and album tracks by Glen Campbell released on Capitol records between 1963 and 1971. This album should  not be confused with the 1967 Capitol studio album Gentle on My Mind.

Track listing
Side 1:
 "Gentle On My Mind" (John Hartford) – 2:56
 "Catch the Wind" (Donovan Phillips Leitch) – 2:15
 "Everything A Man Could Ever Need" (Mac Davis) – 2:26
 "Long Black Limousine" (Vern Stovall, Bobby George) – 2:15
 "Tomorrow Never Comes" (Ernest Tubb, Johnny Bond) – 2:27

Side 2:
 "Love Story" (Francis Lai, Gimbel) – 3:01
 "My Baby's Gone" (Hazel Houser) – 2:50
 "The James Bond Theme" (Monty Norman) – 2:17
 "You'll Never Walk Alone" (Richard Rodgers, Oscar Hammerstein II) – 2:49
 "Try A Little Kindness" (Curt Sapaugh, Bobby Austin) – 2:23

Albums produced by Nick Venet
1972 compilation albums
Glen Campbell compilation albums